Uladzislau Yuryevich Palkhouski (born 17 June 1998) is a Belarusian ice dancer. With his skating partner, Emiliya Kalehanova, he is a two-time Belarusian national silver medalist (2019–20) and has competed in the final segment at two World Junior Championships (2017, 2019).

Programs 
(with Kalehanova)

Competitive highlights 
CS: Challenger Series; JGP: Junior Grand Prix

With Cottrell for the United States

With Kalehanova for Belarus

References

External links 
 

1998 births
Belarusian male ice dancers
Figure skaters at the 2016 Winter Youth Olympics
Living people
People from Baranavichy
Sportspeople from Brest Region